Loxopholis is a genus of lizards in the family Gymnophthalmidae. The genus is endemic to South America.

Species
The genus Loxopholis contains 11 species which are recognized as being valid.
Loxopholis caparensis 
Loxopholis ferreirai 
Loxopholis guianense 
Loxopholis hexalepis  - six-scaled tegu
Loxopholis ioanna 
Loxopholis osvaldoi 
Loxopholis parietalis  - common root lizard
Loxopholis percarinatum  - Müller's tegu
Loxopholis rugiceps 
Loxopholis snethlageae 
Loxopholis southi  - northern spectacled lizard

Nota bene: A binomial authority in parentheses indicates that the species was originally described in a genus other than Loxopholis.

References

Further reading
Cope ED (1869). "Sixth Contribution to the HERPETOLOGY of South America". Proceedings of the Academy of Natural Sciences of Philadelphia 20: 305–313. (Loxopholis, new genus, p. 305; L. rugiceps, new species, pp. 305–306).

 
Lizard genera
Lizards of South America
Taxa named by Edward Drinker Cope